Pammi Somal (born 3 October 1955) is an Indian filmmaker and Bollywood journalist.

Biography
Pammi Somal was born 3 October 1955. She studied at Carmel Convent in Chandigarh and earned a Masters in Sociology from Punjab University. After moving to Mumbai, she gained a diploma in Mass Communication & Journalism and another one in Creative Writing.
She has a master's degree in Reiki along with a degree in Silva Mind Method and Law of Attraction.

Somal has written for various Bollywood magazines and has served as Assistant Editor with Cine Blitz for many years.

In the 1990s, she started writing scripts for television serials and launched a magazine Cafe Celeb in 2003. After functioning as the CEO of a corporate house and President - Business Development for a Singapore-based media company, she started her own production company, Creative Steps Productions in 2006. 
Since then, she has produced, written and directed two films, Mummy Punjabi (August 2011) and Na Jaane Kabse (September 2011).

Filmography

Television
 Ardhangini- 1994- Writer & Producer
 Sanam – 1996- Story, Screenplay & Dialogues
 Neeyat- 1999- Story, Screenplay & Dialogues
 Kasauti- 2000- Story, Screenplay & Dialogues
 Naqaab-2000- Story, Screenplay & Dialogues
 Siski- 2001- Screenplay
 Hare Kaanch Ki Churiaan (Telefilm)- 2001- Story, Screenplay & Dialogues
 Na Jaane Kyun- 2001- Story & Dialogues
 Sukanya- 2002- Dialogues
 Samay ki Dhadkan- 2002- Story, Screenplay & Dialogues
 Naata – 2002 - Story, Screenplay & Dialogues
 Muskurahat- 2002- Story, Screenplay & Dialogues

Films
 The Perfect Husband- (English)-2002- Dialogues
 Mummy Punjabi - (English / Hindi)- 2011- Writer, Director & Producer
 Na Jaane Kabse - (Hindi)-2011- Writer, Director & Producer

References

Sources 
http://www.tribuneindia.com/2008/20080215/ttlife1.htm
http://www.pammisomal.com/site/gallery.html
https://web.archive.org/web/20110716095306/http://smashits.com/mummy-ji-movie-muharat/event-1460-picture-1.html
https://web.archive.org/web/20101204042659/http://www.bharatwaves.com/news/Big-role-for-Bwoods-big-momma-3835.html
https://archive.today/20130218024741/http://entertainment.oneindia.in/bollywood/features/virafpatel080307.html

External links 
her personal website

1955 births
Living people
Screenwriters from Mumbai
Journalists from Maharashtra
Indian television writers
Indian women television writers
Women writers from Maharashtra
Hindi screenwriters
20th-century Indian women writers
20th-century Indian dramatists and playwrights